Nilkantha Das (born 12 April 1988) is an Indian cricketer. He made his first-class debut on 27 January 2020, for Bengal in the 2019–20 Ranji Trophy.

References

External links
 

1988 births
Living people
Indian cricketers
Bengal cricketers
Place of birth missing (living people)